Timothy S. Leatherman is the founder, chairman and chief executive of Leatherman Tool Group, Inc.

Biography
Leatherman graduated from Oregon State University in 1970 with a bachelor's degree in mechanical engineering. According to an article in The Oregonian, "Leatherman came up with the idea of a 'Boy Scout knife with pliers' during a 1975 driving tour of Europe with his wife, when he was unable to use his pocket knife to fix his repeatedly malfunctioning car." It took him several months afterwards to refine his idea, and he was granted a patent on the first Leatherman tool in 1980. Leatherman spent the next few years attempting to market his product to large companies with technical staff, such as AT&T, but this was largely unsuccessful. The tool eventually gained popularity through mail order catalogues.

See also
List of Oregon State University alumni

References 

Living people
American inventors
Year of birth missing (living people)
Place of birth missing (living people)
Oregon State University alumni
Businesspeople from Oregon